Mari Carmen Ramírez-Garcia is an American art historian, art curator, and the Wortham Curator of Latin American art at the Museum of Fine Arts, Houston.

Early Life and Education 
Ramírez was born and raised in San Juan, Puerto Rico, where her mother was a medical researcher and her father a civil engineer. She received undergraduate education at the University of Puerto Rico. Awarded a master's degree in 1978, she   earned a doctorate in 1988 at the University of Chicago, where she wrote a dissertation on Mexican muralists of the 1920s.

Career
Ramirez began her career in Puerto Rico, where she served as assistant director of the Ponce Museum of Art, and director of the Museo de Antropología, Historia y Arte at the University of Puerto Rico Rio Piedras campus from 1985 to 1988. Whille at the University of Texas at Austin from 1989 to 2000, she established the Latin American program within the Jack C. Blanton Museum of Art and was recognized as the first curator of Latin American art in the United States. She joined the Museum of Fine Arts, Houston in May 2001. With MFAH director Peter C. Marzio, she founded the International Center for the Arts of the Americas that same year. Time magazine named her one of the most influential Hispanic people in the United States.

References

American art curators
American women curators
Women museum directors
Directors of museums in the United States
American art historians
Museum of Fine Arts, Houston
1955 births
Living people
American people of Puerto Rican descent
University of Puerto Rico alumni
University of Chicago alumni